Trismelasmos minimus is a moth in the family Cossidae. It is found in New Guinea, where it has been recorded from Papua, Papua New Guinea and the Bismarck Archipelago. The habitat consists of lowland and coastal areas.

References

Zeuzerinae